John Edmunds is a British academic who set up the Drama Department at the University College of Wales, Aberystwyth where he was Head from 1973 to 1985.  Edmunds trained as an actor but is best known as an ABC TV and Associated Rediffusion continuity announcer.

Early years
Born in Aberystwyth, Edmunds attended Ardwyn Grammar School in the town before attending the University College of Wales, Aberystwyth where he studied English and French in the late 1940s and early 50s where he also performed as an amateur actor before being asked to join a local repertory company during the holidays. After doing his National Service. Alongside his early TV announcing work, Edmunds was a part-time teacher in English. He taught at Battersea Grammar School in Streatham, London from the early to mid sixties. He also did a spell of teaching - French this time - at Henry Thornton Grammar School in Clapham in 1954–5.

Edmunds is best known as an ABC TV and Associated Rediffusion continuity announcer  who later presented BBC Children's TV's Top of the Form, 1966 - 1967. He was a BBC TV newsreader from September 1968 until September 1973, and then again in October 1974 and between September 1979 and June 1981. Edmunds also presented the BBC's regional London TV magazine, Town and Around in 1968/1969 and BBC Radio 4's You and Yours in 1972.

Later career
From 1973 to 1985 Edmunds was Head of Drama at the University College of Wales, Aberystwyth, where his students included Neil Brand and Sharon Maguire. He was Professor of Drama at the University of the Americas, Mexico, and University of California, Santa Cruz, from 1985 to 1997.

He returned to the UK and appeared in several theatre productions including his own drama, verse and prose recitals.  His translations of works by French dramatists Racine and Molière have been published by Penguin and performed on BBC Radio.

Edmunds also appeared in cameo roles in the films  Lifeforce  (1985), Love in Limbo, (1993), Rendezvous with Zack (2000) and The Faces of the Moon (2002).

References

External links
 Edmunds on The TV Room Plus
 
 
 

Living people
1930s births
British television presenters
British male journalists
Gay academics
British LGBT broadcasters
British LGBT journalists
BBC newsreaders and journalists
Radio and television announcers
English LGBT people
People from Aberystwyth
Academics of Aberystwyth University
Alumni of Aberystwyth University
Alumni of the University of Wales